Ibifornia is the fourth studio album by French electronic duo Cassius. It was released on 26 August 2016.

Composition

Cassius were inspired to produce an album with a bright, happy tone by their experiences of listening to the Bob Marley & the Wailers album Exodus (1977). Their intention with Ibifornia was to create a "fun electronic music without making it cheesy", due to the abundance of dark and depressing electronic dance music popular at the time. In coming up with a cheerful vibe for the LP, they decided that it would take place in a fantasy utopia land named Ibifornia.

Cassius and the press release categorized the style of Ibifornia as a hybrid of funk, house, soul, Afrobeat, synthpop, psychedelia, hip hop, gospel and disco.

Track listing

Charts

References

2016 albums
Cassius (band) albums
Because Music albums
Ed Banger Records albums